Sphodromantis gracilis is a species of praying mantis found in Gabon, Ghana, Guinea, Nigeria, Senegal, and Central African Republic.

See also
African mantis
List of mantis genera and species

References

G
Mantodea of Africa
Insects of the Central African Republic
Insects of Gabon
Insects of West Africa
Insects described in 1930